Mantoida brunneriana is a species of praying mantis in the family Mantoididae. It is found in Bolivia, Brazil, French Guiana, Paraguay, and Venezuela.

References

B
Mantodea of South America
Invertebrates of Bolivia
Insects of Brazil
Fauna of French Guiana
Invertebrates of Paraguay
Invertebrates of Venezuela
Insects described in 1871
Taxa named by Henri Louis Frédéric de Saussure